Salvia schizocalyx is a perennial plant that is native to Yunnan province in China, growing at  elevation.

Notes

schizocalyx
Flora of China